The Van Horn-Ackerman House, is located in Wyckoff, Bergen County, New Jersey, United States. The house was added to the National Register of Historic Places on January 10, 1983. The house was built in 1745 by Barent Van Horn and is referred to as a telescope house because of the way it starts as a small house and larger additions were built later.

See also 
 National Register of Historic Places listings in Bergen County, New Jersey

References

Houses on the National Register of Historic Places in New Jersey
Houses completed in 1745
Houses in Bergen County, New Jersey
Stone houses in New Jersey
National Register of Historic Places in Bergen County, New Jersey
Wyckoff, New Jersey
New Jersey Register of Historic Places
1745 establishments in New Jersey